James Paine may refer to:

James Paine (architect) (1717–1789), English architect
James Paine (rower), English rower
James Paine (sculptor) (1745–1829), English sculptor and architect
James Carriger Paine (1924–2010), American judge

See also
James Pain (1779–1877), English architect
James Payn (1830–1898), English novelist
James Payne (disambiguation)
 Paine (surname)